We Are Revolting: Live & Obscure 1990–1994 was a compilation album by Me Mom & Morgentaler, released in 1994 on Chooch Records. It was the band's final release, and compiled several live and rare tracks from the band's catalogue. The album was also rereleased in 1999 on Stomp Records.

Several of the songs were incorrectly labelled on the original 1994 release.

Track listing
 "Beneath the Planet of the Corporate Cockroaches"
 "Master of the Universe"
 "Tailspin"
 "Everybody's Got AIDS"
 "My Mother’s Friends"
 "Auparavant"
 "Laura"
 "Spittle on My Chin"
 "You Can Quote Her on That"
 "Pepita la pistolera"
 "Under the Searchlight"

1994 compilation albums
Me Mom and Morgentaler albums